Jordan James Cecil Wynter (born 24 November 1993) is an English footballer who plays as a defender or midfielder for Dartford.

Club career

Early career
Wynter joined Arsenal youth ranks in 2002 from local side Redbridge United, aged 8, and signed a professional deal in 2012. He made seven appearances for the under-21 side in 2012–13 season, and was awarded  number 63 jersey for the first-team squad. On 22 May 2013, Wynter joined Bristol City, in a two-year deal. On 3 August, he professional debut, in a 2–2 home draw against Bradford City. He scored his first goal for the club 3 days later, in a 2–0 win against Gillingham in the League Cup.

Cheltenham Town
On 22 August 2014, Wynter joined League Two side Cheltenham Town on a one-month loan deal from Bristol City. A day later, Wynter scored on his Cheltenham debut during their 3–2 away victory against Tranmere Rovers. Wynter went onto appear five more times for Cheltenham before returning to Bristol City at the end of the month.

On 2 February 2015, Wynter returned Cheltenham Town on an eighteen-month deal after leaving Bristol City on a free transfer. Five days later, Wynter made his Cheltenham return in their 3–1 home defeat against Burton Albion, featuring for the entire 90 minutes.

On 7 September 2015, Wynter joined Isthmian League Premier Division side Farnborough on a one-month loan deal. On the same day, Wynter made his Farnborough debut in their 3–2 home defeat against Staines Town, featuring for 63 minutes before being replaced by Nathan Chambers. Wynter made a total of five appearances for Farnborough before returning to Cheltenham after suffering an injury.

In December 2015, he joined AFC Telford United on a loan deal from Cheltenham Town. On 12 December 2015, Wynter made his Telford debut in their FA Trophy first round tie against Chester, which resulted in a 2–0 defeat for the Bucks. On 29 January 2016, Wynter's loan spell at Telford was extended until the end of the campaign.

Barton Rovers
In July 2016, preceding his release from Cheltenham, Wynter joined Southern League Division One Central side Barton Rovers. On the opening day of the 2016–17 campaign, Wynter made his Barton Rovers debut in their 2–1 home defeat against Fleet Town. On 27 September 2016, Wynter scored his first and only goal for Barton Rovers in their 6–3 away victory against Royston Town. Wynter made eleven appearances, scoring once for Barton Rovers in total before leaving the club in late 2016.

Bromley
In December 2016, Wynter joined National League side Bromley on a non-contract basis. On 17 December 2016, Wynter made his Bromley debut in their 2–1 victory against Macclesfield Town, coming off the bench in the 92nd minute to replace George Porter. After almost a month at the club, Wynter was finally rewarded with his first start in Bromley's 5–1 home defeat against Forest Green Rovers, featuring for the entire 90 minutes. Following this heavy defeat, Wynter failed to feature again until February. On 11 March 2017, Wynter went onto score his first goal for Bromley in their 3–0 home victory over North Ferriby United, coming on in the 92nd minute and scoring within seconds of featuring.

Although Wynter was invited back to pre-season training for Bromley's forthcoming season, he instead decided to leave the club.

Woking
On 30 June 2017, Wynter joined fellow National League side Woking on a one-year deal. On 12 August 2017, Wynter made his Woking debut during their 3–0 away defeat against Barrow, featuring for 63 minutes before being replaced by Chez Isaac. Following an injury to Richard Orlu, Wynter replaced the skipper and formed a partnership with Josh Staunton, in which Woking only lost once in the space of a month. Following a prolonged injury, Wynter returned to the Woking side after a three-month lay-off, replacing Joey Jones during the Cards' 3–0 away defeat against Leyton Orient.

Maidstone United
On 24 May 2018, following Woking's relegation to the National League South, Wynter opted to join Maidstone United on a one-year deal. On 28 September Wynter joined Dartford on an initial month's loan.

Dartford
On 15 May 2019, Wynter joined Dartford on a permanent basis.

Career statistics

References

External links

1993 births
Living people
Footballers from the London Borough of Redbridge
English footballers
Association football midfielders
Arsenal F.C. players
Bristol City F.C. players
Cheltenham Town F.C. players
Farnborough F.C. players
AFC Telford United players
Barton Rovers F.C. players
Bromley F.C. players
Woking F.C. players
Maidstone United F.C. players
English Football League players
Black British sportspeople